Anna-Marie de Zwager (born September 17, 1976)  is a Canadian rower from Victoria, British Columbia.

At the 2004 Summer Olympics, she finished in 7th place in the women's eight event, and at the 2008 Summer Olympics, she finished in 8th place in the women's quad sculls.

She attended the University of Victoria where she also played in goal on the Varsity field hockey side.

De Zwager also coaches the Oak Bay High School Rowing Team, and has contributed to many of the team's successes.

References

1976 births
Living people
Canadian female rowers
Olympic rowers of Canada
Rowers from Victoria, British Columbia
Rowers at the 2008 Summer Olympics
Rowers at the 2004 Summer Olympics
Canadian female field hockey players
Canadian people of Dutch descent
University of Victoria alumni
21st-century Canadian women